Darone Cave is a cave in Bardaskan County, Iran. It is located in Cave Doruneh, Bardaskan.

References 

Caves of Iran
Bardaskan
Landforms of Razavi Khorasan Province